I Found The Gown is an American wedding dress shop reality series airing on TLC as part of that network's Friday evening "wedding block" of programming. The series films at "VOWS Bridal Outlet", a discount wedding dress shop in Watertown, Massachusetts in suburban Boston which has existed since 1992.

Show 
The program mainly chronicles two aspects: the owners of VOWS, Rick and Leslie DeAngelo searching for discounted and discontinued dresses in back rooms and department store warehouses to sell, and the brides that come to the store searching for the deeply discounted dress of their dreams and the experience of the shop. Generally the name-brand designer gowns sell for 50-80% off their original pricing.

The show premiered on August 24, 2012, and was renewed for a second season, which began on April 19, 2013.

Reception 
Tom Conroy of Media Life Magazine called the show painless and inoffensive but cited its apparent appeal to audiences as inexplicable.

References

External links 
 

Wedding television shows
TLC (TV network) original programming
2010s American reality television series
2012 American television series debuts
2014 American television series endings
Wedding dresses